The Phenomenon soundtrack is a compilation album by various artists released for Reprise Records, who contributed to the music score of the 1996 American romantic fantasy drama film Phenomenon, starring John Travolta. The soundtrack features performances by international music stars including Eric Clapton, Bryan Ferry and Peter Gabriel, and went on to be a high-selling soundtrack release. The single "Change the World", performed by Eric Clapton, which was released off the album became a global hit and helped to promote the soundtrack's sales figures. "Everyday Is A Winding Road", from Sheryl Crow's 1996 self-titled album, was featured in the film, but not on the soundtrack.

Reception
The soundtrack album topped the Billboard 200 album chart and sold more than 1.5 million copies while on chart, gaining a Platinum disc from the Recording Industry Association of America. Critics from the MovieTunes website called the release "more than simply an aural souvenir of a magical movie experience. It is the cutting edge of a collaborative art-form whose time has come". In his review for the music website AllMusic, journalist and critic Stephen Thomas Erlewine notes:

Track listing

Certifications

References

1996 soundtrack albums
Albums produced by Robbie Robertson
Reprise Records soundtracks
Pop soundtracks
Soft rock soundtracks